Bicyclus moyses is a butterfly in the family Nymphalidae. It is found in various parts of Africa, most commonly in Cameroon.

Description
The morphology of Bicyclus moyses is similar to that of Bicyclus dorothea and Bicyclus jefferyi. The dorsal area of Bicyclus moyses is evenly brown with a distinct violet patina. The underside of its wings are browner with a clear banding pattern.

Distribution
Bicyclus moyses is most commonly found in southern Cameroon but has also been spotted in neighbouring African countries including Gabon, Angola, and the Democratic Republic of the Congo, with a fraction of the population spilling over to the Central African Republic.

References

Elymniini
Butterflies described in 1964